The 2017–18 SV Darmstadt 98 season was the 120th season in the football club's history and their 18th overall season in the second tier of German football, the 2. Bundesliga. It was the club's first season back in the second division, since relegation from the Bundesliga in 2016–17.

Squad

Appearances and goals

|-
! colspan=14 style=background:#dcdcdc; text-align:center| Goalkeepers

|-
! colspan=14 style=background:#dcdcdc; text-align:center| Defenders

|-
! colspan=14 style=background:#dcdcdc; text-align:center| Midfielders

|-
! colspan=14 style=background:#dcdcdc; text-align:center| Forwards

Transfers

In

Out

Friendlies

Pre-season

Competitions

Bundesliga

League table

Results summary

Results by round

Matches

DFB-Pokal

References

SV Darmstadt 98 seasons
Darmstadt